Michael Phenix (born 15 March 1989) is an English retired footballer who last played for Southport.

Career

Early career
Phenix was born in Manchester and began his career at Bolton Wanderers academy. He failed to earn a professional contract at Bolton and began playing amateur football with Manchester League side Hindsford. After a trial at Notts County, Phenix played for Droylsden and Skelmersdale United before joining AFC Telford United. He missed a month of the 2013–14 season after suffering from ulcerative colitis.

Barnsley
In October 2014 Phenix joined League One side Barnsley for a fee of £25,000. He made his Football League debut on 17 January 2015 in a 1–0 defeat against Doncaster Rovers. After struggling for game time at Oakwell Phenix went out on loan to Macclesfield Town in March 2015.

Southport
Despite playing several times for Barnsley in pre-season in 2015, he again went out on loan to Southport on 11 August 2015. He made his debut for Southport the same day, playing the full 90 minutes in their 0–0 draw with Macclesfield. His first goal for the club came in a 2–2 home draw against Tranmere Rovers on 15 September 2015. In October 2015 Phenix had his role terminated by the club however he signed for the club after he agreed a deal for the remainder of the 2015–16 season. He was released at the end of the season, scoring five goals and making 36 appearances for the club.

Salford City
He joined Salford City in late May 2016.

Mike made his Salford debut on the opening day of the 2016-2017 when Gloucester visited Moor Lane, The Ammies' first ever National League North fixture would finish 0-0 but 'Pheno' was soon on the goal trail. He scored in each of the next five matches, including a winner against local rivals FC United of Manchester. Sixteen goals were recorded over a campaign that ended in play-off disappointment but he had the consolation of finishing as the club's top scorer. He made a vital contribution during the 2017-2018 title winning season too, notching eleven times.

Southport (second spell)
In June 2018 he re-joined Southport. In October 2018, having made seven league appearances on his return to Southport, his contract was terminated with immediate effect. Phenix thereafter announced his retirement from football.  In May 2019 it was announced he had been banned from all football and football-related activity for four years after a failed out of competition drugs test.

References

External links

1989 births
Living people
English footballers
Association football forwards
English Football League players
National League (English football) players
Northern Premier League players
Droylsden F.C. players
Skelmersdale United F.C. players
AFC Telford United players
Barnsley F.C. players
Macclesfield Town F.C. players
Southport F.C. players
Salford City F.C. players
English sportspeople in doping cases
Doping cases in association football